Jean-Louis Haguenauer (born 1954) is a French classical pianist.

Biography 
Born in Paris, Haguenauer has taken courses in music analysis, writing and music composition with Nadia Boulanger and Henri Dutilleux. He worked with Louis Hiltbrand, Germaine Mounier, Alfred Loewenguth and Jean Fassina.

In chamber formation, he works notably with Jeff Cohen, Alexis Galpérine, Annick Roussin, Jaime Laredo, Pierre-Henri Xuereb, Atar Arad, Arnaud Thorette, Cécilia Tsan, Sharon Robinson, Tsuyoshi Tsutsumi, Patrick Gallois, Thomas Robertello,  Michel Lethiec, James Campbell, the Ebène Quartet, the Fine Arts Quartet, the Stanislas Ensemble, Les Percussions de Strasbourg and the "Accroche-Notes" ensemble. From 1991 to 1997, he was a member of the Florence Gould Hall Chamber Players, and from 2003 to 2007, of the American Chamber Players.

Haguenauer has been invited to the Festival de La Roque-d'Anthéron, La Folle Journée of Nantes, the Radio France-Montpellier festival, the Church of the Jacobins in Toulouse, the Orangerie de Sceaux, the Vichy opera, the Library of Congress, and the Kreeger Museum festivals.

For the past twenty years, he has formed a duo with tenor Gilles Ragon, with whom he has deepened the repertoire of French mélodies and lieder.

From 1988 to 1998, he taught the piano at the Conservatoire de Strasbourg.

In 2012, he finished the first complete recording of Claude Debussy's melodies, made in Brive-la-Gaillarde, on the composer's piano kept at the Brive Museum.

He currently lives in the United-States and teaches at the Indiana University Bloomington.

Discography 
 Ernest Bloch's works for viola, with Pierre-Henry Xuereb, Andras Adorjan; éditions Adda, 1989
 Carl Maria von Weber's Chamber music: Piano quartet, Flute trio, Variations for violin and piano; Alexis Galperine, Pierre-Henry Xuereb, Cecilia Tsan, Jean-Christophe Falala; éditions Timpani, 1991
 Transcriptions of Beethoven's symphonies n°1 et 2 by Franz Liszt, éditions Harmonia Mundi, 1995; 
 Francis Bayer's Cinq Essais, with Renaud François, flute; Alain Meunier, cello; Épisode, Tétra Ensemble, with Madalena Soveral, piano; Christian Hamouy and Georges Van Gucht, percussions, éditions Pierre Vérany, 1996;
 Claude Debussy's Préludes, éditions Ligia Digital, 1998
 Claude Debussy's Piano music, éditions Meridian Records, 1999
 Guy Ropartz's Trio in A minor for violin, cello and piano, with Alexis Gasparine, violin; Cecilia Tsan, cello, éditions Timpani, 1999
 Guy Ropartz's 1st and 2nd sonatas for violin and piano, with Alexis Galpérine, éditions La Guilde des musiciens, 2003 
 Beethoven's An die ferne Geliebte and Robert Schumann, Fantasie op.17 Dichterliebe, with Gilles Ragon, tenor; éditions Saphir Productions
 Igor Stravinsky's Histoire du soldat and other pieces, with Michel Lethiec, Patrick Gallois, Annick Roussin, Alexis Galperine, Pierre-Henry Xuereb, Philippe Muller, Francis Pierre; éditions Saphir Productions, 2010
 Hector Berlioz's Mélodies and duos, with Gilles Ragon, Didier Henry, éditions Maguelone, 2013
 Johann Strauss' Four Waltz, Transcription by Schoenberg, Berg and Webern, Stanislas ensemble, éditions Gallo
 Claude Debussy's complete melodies

Prizes and awards 
 Licence de concerts à l'unanimité à l'École Normale de Musique de Paris, 1973
 First prize for virtuosity unanimously, with congratulations from the jury, at the Conservatoire de Musique de Genève (Louis Hiltbrand's class), 1977
 Counterpoint and Fugue Prize at the Geneva Conservatory
 Lili Boulanger Composition prize
 Laureate of the Yehudi Menuhin Foundation, 1983

References

External links 
 Jean-Louis Haguenauer's Official website
 Jean-Louis Haguenauer on Indiana University Bloomington
 Jean-Louis Hagenauer on ResMusica
 Debussy, intégrale des mélodies
 Debussy, Préludes, livre I, sur Youtube

20th-century French male classical pianists
21st-century French male classical pianists
1954 births
Living people
Musicians from Paris
Piano pedagogues